The L'Arc Macau is a hotel and casino in Sé, Macau, China.

The casino and hotel is 53 floors, has 283 rooms, and is located across from the Wynn Hotel and Casino. The architecture is Portuguese-influenced, with a distinctively large pot of gold in its lobby.

History
L'Arc Macau opened on 20 September 2009.

See also
 Gambling in Macau

References

External links

Photos Of L'Arc Macau
Online Casino Website

Casinos in Macau
Hotels in Macau
Casino hotels
2009 establishments in Macau
Hotels established in 2009
Casinos completed in 2009